Cnemaspis amba, the Amba dwarf gecko, is a species of diurnal, rock-dwelling, insectivorous gecko endemic to  India. It is distributed in Maharashtra.

References

 Cnemaspis amba

amba
Reptiles of India
Reptiles described in 2019